The Sretensky Theological Academy is a higher educational institution of the Russian Orthodox Church that trains Orthodox clergy. It is located on the territory of the Sretensky Monastery in the Sretensky District of Moscow. The academy has an extensive library (more than 40 thousand titles), which includes books of the 16th-19th centuries and a small archaeological museum (about 30 exhibits). There are electives for in-depth study of ancient languages (Ancient Greek, Ancient Hebrew).

History
It was opened in 1999 as an Orthodox higher religious school. On December 26, 2002, it was transformed into a theological seminary. On April 13, 2021, it was transformed into a theological academy. On December 28, 2013, Patriarch of Moscow and all Rus', Kirill of Moscow, consecrated the new building of the Sretensky Seminary, equipped for teaching and living for students. Since May 19, 2018, the acting rector is Hieromonk Siluan (Nikitin). Since 29 of Dececember 2022, the rector of the academy is Ioann (Lydischev).

References

Universities and colleges affiliated with the Russian Orthodox Church
2002 establishments in Russia
Educational institutions established in 2002
Christian organizations established in 2002
Meshchansky District

ru:Сретенская духовная академия